Remie is both a given name and a surname. Notable people with the name include:

 Jan Remie (1924–1950), Dutch boxer
 Olivia Remie Constable (1961–2014), American historian
 Remie Olmberg (born 1950), Surinamese football player
 Remie Streete (born 1994), English football player